The 2005 National Club Baseball Association (NCBA) World Series was played at McKechnie Field in Bradenton, FL from May 25 to May 30. The fifth tournament's champion was Colorado State University. This was Colorado State's second consecutive title as they became the first team in NCBA history to repeat as national champions. The Most Valuable Player was Brooks Purdy of Colorado State University.

Format
The format is similar to the NCAA College World Series in that eight teams participate in two four-team double elimination brackets with the only difference being that in the NCBA, there is only one game that decides the national championship rather than a best-of-3 like the NCAA.  This was the final season in which only 7 innings were played in NCBA World Series play.  Starting in 2006, NCBA World Series games became 9 inning contests.

Participants

Results

Bracket

Game Results

References

Sports in Bradenton, Florida
Baseball competitions in Florida
2005 in sports in Florida
2005 in baseball
National Club Baseball Association